Clyde Lowaine Reese III known professionally as Clyde L. Reese (December 8, 1958 – December 17, 2022) was an American lawyer who served as a judge of the Georgia Court of Appeals.

Early life and education
Reese was born in Florence, South Carolina, on December 8, 1958. He, along with his cousin, Marsha Reese and her cousin, Alonzo Brown, were some of the first students to integrate Pace Academy in 1969, he graduated from Pace Academy in 1976. He attended Georgia State University and received a Bachelor of Arts in 1980. He received a Juris Doctor from Mercer University School of Law in 1996.

Career

Private practice 
In 2003, Reese left state government for the private practice of law. From 2003 to 2004, he practiced with Rod Meadows at Meadows & Lewis in Stockbridge, Georgia. From 2004 to 2007 he was owner and principal of Reese & Hopkins, LLC, a firm specializing in state and federal health care regulatory matters.

State service
In the summer of 1996, Reese began work as an assistant attorney general in the Georgia Department of Law under Attorney General Mike Bowers. He was later hired as counsel for the Department of Insurance, the Subsequent Injury Trust Fund, and the State Health Planning Agency.

In the fall of 2007, Reese returned to state government with Department of Community Health (DCH) to oversee the Certificate of Need program and as general counsel. In May 2010, Governor Sonny Perdue appointed him as Commissioner of DCH. In January 2011, Governor Nathan Deal appointed Reese as Commissioner of the Department of Human Services.

On May 30, 2013, Governor Nathan Deal appointed Reese to be the commissioner of the Department of Community Health. He served in that capacity until his appointment to the Court of Appeals.

Judicial servrice
On October 31, 2016, Governor Nathan Deal appointed Reese to a seat on the Georgia Court of Appeals being vacated by the retirement of Judge Herbert E. Phipps. He began active service on the court on December 1, 2016.

Personal life and death
Reese was the father of five children. He was a resident of Douglas County, Georgia. He died unexpectedly on December 17, 2022, at the age of 64.

References

External links
Official Biography on Georgia Judicial Branch website

1958 births
2022 deaths
20th-century American lawyers
21st-century American judges
21st-century American lawyers
20th-century African-American people
21st-century African-American people
African-American judges
African-American lawyers
Georgia Court of Appeals judges
Georgia (U.S. state) lawyers
Georgia State University alumni
Mercer University alumni
People from Florence, South Carolina